In database theory, a join dependency is a constraint on the set of legal relations over a database scheme. If one of the tables in the join has all the attributes of the table , the join dependency is called trivial.

Another way to describe a join dependency is to say that the relationships in the join dependency are independent of each other.

Unlike in the case of functional dependencies, there is no sound and complete axiomatization for join dependencies, though axiomatization exist for more expressive dependency languages such as full typed dependencies. However, implication of join dependencies is decidable.

Formal definition 

The relation  satisfies the join dependency

  if 

2-ary join dependencies are called multivalued dependency as a historical artifact of the fact that they were studied before the general case. More specifically if U is a set of attributes and R a relation over it, then R satisfies  if and only if R satisfies

Example 
Given a pizza-chain that models purchases in table Order = {order-number, customer-name, pizza-name, courier}.
The following relations can be derived:
 customer-name depends on order-number
 pizza-name depends on order-number
 courier depends on order-number
Since the relationships are independent there is a join dependency as follows: *((order-number, customer-name), (order-number, pizza-name), (order-number, courier)).

If each customer has his own courier however, there can be a join-dependency like this: *((order-number, customer-name), (order-number, pizza-name), (order-number, courier), (customer-name, courier)), 
but *((order-number, customer-name, courier), (order-number, pizza-name)) would be valid as well. This makes it obvious that just having a join dependency is not enough to normalize a database scheme.

See also
 Chase (algorithm)
 Universal relation assumption

References 

Database normalization